Seminole is an unincorporated community located along U.S. Route 421 in the Upper Little River Township of Harnett County, North Carolina, United States, near the county line with Lee County just outside the town of Broadway . It is a part of the Dunn Micropolitan Area, which is also a part of the greater Raleigh–Durham–Cary Combined Statistical Area (CSA) as defined by the United States Census Bureau.

Daniels Creek, a tributary to the Cape Fear River, rises just north of Seminole.

References
 

Unincorporated communities in Harnett County, North Carolina
Unincorporated communities in North Carolina